Glucose transporter 2 (GLUT2) also known as solute carrier family 2 (facilitated glucose transporter), member 2 (SLC2A2) is a transmembrane carrier protein that enables protein facilitated glucose movement across cell membranes. It is the principal transporter for transfer of glucose between liver and blood Unlike GLUT4, it does not rely on insulin for facilitated diffusion.

In humans, this protein is encoded by the SLC2A2 gene.

Tissue distribution 
GLUT2 is found in cellular membranes of:
 liver (Primary)
 pancreatic β cell (Primary in mice, tertiary in humans after GLUT1 and GLUT3)
 hypothalamus (Not overly significant)
 basolateral membrane of small intestine and apical GLUT2 is also suggested.
 basolateral membrane of renal tubular cells

Function 

GLUT2 has high capacity for glucose but low affinity (high KM, ca. 15–20 mM) and thus functions as part of the "glucose sensor" in the pancreatic β-cells of rodents, though in human β-cells the role of GLUT2 seems to be a minor one. It is a very efficient carrier for glucose.

GLUT2 also carries glucosamine.

When the glucose concentration in the lumen of the small intestine goes above 30 mM, such as occurs in the fed-state, GLUT2 is up-regulated at the brush border membrane, enhancing the capacity of glucose transport. Basolateral GLUT2 in enterocytes also aids in the transport of fructose into the bloodstream through glucose-dependent cotransport.

Clinical significance 

Defects in the SLC2A2 gene are associated with a particular type of glycogen storage disease called Fanconi-Bickel syndrome.

In drug-treated diabetic pregnancies in which glucose levels in the woman are uncontrolled, neural tube and cardiac defects in the early-developing brain, spine, and heart depend upon functional GLUT2 carriers, and defects in the GLUT2 gene have been shown to be protective against such defects in rats.  However, whilst a lack of GLUT2 adaptability is negative, it is important to remember the fact that the main result of untreated gestational diabetes appears to cause babies to be of above-average size, which may well be an advantage that is managed very well with a healthy GLUT2 status.

Maintaining a regulated osmotic balance of sugar concentration between the blood circulation and the interstitial spaces is critical in some cases of edema including cerebral edema.

GLUT2 appears to be particularly important to osmoregulation, and preventing edema-induced stroke, transient ischemic attack or coma, especially when blood glucose concentration is above average. GLUT2 could reasonably be referred to as the "diabetic glucose transporter" or a "stress hyperglycemia glucose transporter."

SLC2A2 was associated with clinical stages and independently associated with overall survival in patients with HCC, and could be considered a new prognostic factor for HCC.

Interactive pathway map

See also 
 Glucose transporter

References

External links 
 

Solute carrier family